The Ukrainian National Union (abbreviated UNU) is a Ukrainian far-right organisation. It was founded in 2009 and was a member of Social-National Assembly until 2013.

History
The UNU was founded on December 19, 2009. Its first branches were opened in the cities of Kharkiv, Poltava and Liubotyn. The leader of the UNU was Oleg Goltvyansky, until July 15, 2012 when he was replaced by incumbent Vitaly Krivosheev.

The UNU is an active organiser of political demonstrations, such as marches in Kyiv, Kharkiv and Poltava, done in honour of the Ukrainian Insurgent Army, and marches against illegal immigration in Kharkiv, amongst other activities.

The UNU often directs its activities against groups it perceives as hostile to the Ukrainian state, such as pro-Russian groups during the 2014 pro-Russian unrest in Ukraine and separatists in the War in Donbass.

On October 26, 2012, the UNU established of the paramilitary Alliance of Patriotic Forces.

On April 27, 2013, UNU leaders announced their intentions to create a Ukrainian Nazi party. Until May 22, 2013, the UNU was a member of the Social-National Assembly.

The UNU was an organiser in the Euromaidan protests. During the 2014 Ukrainian revolution, UNU paramilitaries were active in street riots in Kyiv.

In March 2014, Vitaly Krivosheev and Artem Golovko were arrested by the Russian Federal Security Service in Rostov Oblast. According to Russian media, the pair were accused of planning terrorist attacks and acts of sabotage in Russian territory.

Members of the UNU's paramilitary were active in the War in Donbass, On the basis of the Ukrainian National Union was created by the battalion "Pechersk". until it disbanded in the winter of 2015, after the battles in the Luhansk region.
In the elections in 2015 members of the movement were part of the Ukrainian Association of Patriots UKROP coalition. Oleg Goltvyansky won the elections and became a deputy of the Lyubotyn City Council. Vitaly Krivosheev could not win the elections to the Kharkiv Regional Council in the 8th constituency.
In 2020-2021 the organization took a wide part in actions against the increase in utility tariffs. In 2021 due  to a series of UNU mass actions in Kharkiv Aina Tymchuk, the governor of the Kharkiv region, was dismissed on charges of corruption and ties with Russia. In  winter in 2022  protests against the director of the National Bank of Ukraine Kirill Shevchenko began in Kyiv. He was accused by activists of corruption and aiding the Kremlin. As a result Kirill Shevchenko was also dismissed from his post.
After the beginning of the Russian invasion the activists of the organization joined the Armed Forces of Ukraine, the National Guard or are fighting as part of the Rukh prop of the Special Operations Forces.

References

External links
 Ukrainian National UNU official website

Political parties established in 2009
2009 establishments in Ukraine
Organizations based in Kyiv
Far-right political parties in Ukraine
Nationalist parties in Ukraine
Social conservative parties
Anti-Russian sentiment
National conservative parties
Right-wing parties in Europe
Organizations that oppose LGBT rights
Euromaidan
War in Donbas